Austin P. Duke (born August 3, 1993) is a former American football wide receiver for the Barcelona Dragons of the European League of Football (ELF). He played college football for Charlotte and later professionally for the Carolina Panthers of the National Football League (NFL).

College football
In 2013, Duke began his college football career with the Charlotte 49ers as a member of UNC Charlotte's first varsity football team since 1948. As their leading receiver in each of his four seasons with the 49ers, he would go on to finish his college career in 2016 as their all-time leading receiver in receptions (253), receiving yards (3,437), and receiving touchdowns (24).

Professional football

Carolina Panthers
On May 5, 2017, Duke signed with the Carolina Panthers of the National Football League (NFL), and spent the remainder of the 2017 NFL season on the Panthers' practice roster.

On January 1, 2018, Duke was signed to a reserve future contract with the Panthers. Duke would go on to participate in the Panthers' training camp, and appeared in 4 NFL preseason games, accumulating 69 yards on 9 receptions. On September 1, 2018, Duke was released by the Panthers at the end of training camp.

Atlanta Legends
In early 2019, Duke participated in the Alliance of American Football's Atlanta Legends training camp, but was injured and ultimately did not play.

Toronto Argonauts
On May 27, 2019 he signed with the Canadian Football League's Toronto Argonauts. He was released June 7, 2019.

New York Guardians
Duke signed with the New York Guardians of the XFL on January 7, 2020 where he was the league’s top Punt Returner and starter for the NY Guardians. The league suspended operations on April 10, 2020.

In 2022 he joined Barcelona Dragons for the ELF 2023 season.

References

External links 

Charlotte 49ers bio page

1993 births
Living people
African-American players of American football
American football wide receivers
Charlotte 49ers football players
Carolina Panthers players
Atlanta Legends players
Toronto Argonauts players
New York Guardians players
Players of American football from Charlotte, North Carolina
21st-century African-American sportspeople
Barcelona Dragons (ELF) players
American expatriate players of American football
American expatriate sportspeople in Spain